Chondrinidae is a family of mostly minute air-breathing land snails, terrestrial pulmonate gastropod mollusks in the order Pulmonata.

Anatomy
In this family, the number of haploid chromosomes lies between 26 and 30 (according to the values in this table).

Taxonomy

2005 taxonomy 
According to the taxonomy of Bouchet & Rocroi (2005) the family Chondrinidae has no subfamilies.

2010 taxonomy 
Kokshoorn B. & Gittenberger (2010) established a new subfamily to system of Chondrinidae:

 subfamily Chondrininae
 subfamily Granariinae

Genera
 Abida Turton, 1831
 Chondrina Reichenbach, 1828
 Granaria Held, 1838
 Graniberia E. Gittenberger, Kokshoorn, Bössneck, Reijnen & Groenenberg, 2016
 Granopupa Boettger, 1889
 Rupestrella Monterosato, 1894
 Solatopupa Pilsbry, 1917
Synonyms
 Alloglossa Lindström, 1868: synonym of Chondrina Reichenbach, 1828 (objective junior synonym)
 Avenacea Fagot, 1891: synonym of Chondrina Reichenbach, 1828 (objective junior synonym)
 Modicella H. Adams & A. Adams, 1855: synonym of Chondrina Reichenbach, 1828
 Pupella Swainson, 1840: synonym of Granaria Held, 1838
 Sandahlia Westerlund, 1887: synonym of Abida W. Turton, 1831
 Stomodonta Mermet, 1843: synonym of Abida W. Turton, 1831
 Torquilla S. Studer, 1820: synonym of Abida W. Turton, 1831 (homonym; non Torquilla Brisson, 1760 [Aves])

References

External links
 Bouchet, P. & Rocroi, J.-P. (2005). Classification and nomenclator of gastropod families. Malacologia. 47 (1-2): 1-397.

 
Gastropod families